Club Deportivo Brasilia, usually known simply as Brasilia  are a Salvadoran professional football club based in Suchitoto, El Salvador.

History
In 1960, a group met in Suchitoto city hall and decided to form a football team named Xotlan. However, after a few months the club changed their name to Club Deportivo Brasilia Suchitoto, named after Brazil who were the football world champions at the time and after Brazil's newly named capital city. Early players included Gregorio Marroquín, Roberto Guardado, Lito Cañas, Nelson Cañas, Orlando Coto, Roberto Santamaría, Mauricio Montalvo and Mauricio Cañas.

Later on Brasilia were able to obtain the services of Jorge "Magico" Gonzalez and the Paz brothers (Rolando and Ricardo) for a few games.

In the 2012 Clausura, Brasilia had their best season in their history reaching the Segunda División Grand Final, however despite Walter Casco scoring in the 77th minute to level the game, the club went on to lose in extra time with a goal late in second half of extra time.

However, after losing their financial support and coach Milton Melendez in 2015, Brasilia were relegated to the Salvadoran Third Division.

Honours

Domestic honours
 Segunda División Salvadorean and predecessors 
 Champions (1) : TBD
 Tercera División Salvadorean and predecessors 
 Champions:(1) : TBD

Colours and crest

Throughout the club's early history, Brasilia have worn blue with a blue shorts and socks.

Stadium

Estadio Municipal de La Ciudad de Suchitoto
The club's home matches are usually played at Estadio Municipal de La Ciudad de Suchitoto, which has a maximum capacity of 1,000 people. It was renovated in 2009.

List of coaches
  Manuel Antonio Cienfuegos (1976)
  Orlando Cotto (1976–1977)
 Geovanni Portillo
  Víctor Hugo López Santillana (2007-2008)
  Willian Renderos Iraheta (2009)
  Milton Meléndez (2010 – Dec 2014)
  Oliveira (Jan 2015 – Feb 2015)
  Fausto Vásquez (Feb 2015 – July 2015)
  Raul Danilo Castillo (Aug 2015 – Dec 2015)
  Oscar Martinez (Jan 2016 – Feb 2016)
  Erick Cruz (Feb 2016–)
  Walter Vasco (2022)

References

External links
History part 3 – Brasilia Suchitoto Blogspot 

Brasilia
Brasilia
1960 establishments in El Salvador